Orodel is a commune in Dolj County, Oltenia, Romania with a population of 3,242 people. It is composed of five villages: Bechet, Călugărei, Cornu, Orodel, and Teiu.

Natives
Sorin Cârțu
Ilie G. Murgulescu
Nuța Olaru
Victor Pițurcă

References

Communes in Dolj County
Localities in Oltenia